Levi Lapper Morse (24 May 1853 – 10 September 1913) was an English grocer and draper and Liberal Party  politician.

Family and education
Morse was the son of Charles Morse from Stratton St Margaret, near Swindon in Wiltshire. He was educated at the High School, Swindon. He married Winifred, daughter of Isaac Humphries of Broad Hinton, Wiltshire and they had two sons and four daughters. Their son William Ewart Morse was also a Liberal politician in Wiltshire and a Member of Parliament.

Career
Morse was a prominent Swindon shopkeeper  He owned Morse's department store on Regent Street, Swindon the second most important of Swindon's stores for many years. Mostly known as a grocer and draper, he also owned a chain of other shops in the south-west and a large mail order business.

Politics

Local politics

Morse served as an Alderman on Wiltshire County Council and also served as a Justice of the Peace.  He was Mayor of Swindon in 1901.

Parliament

Morse was elected Liberal MP for the Wilton or South Division of Wiltshire at the 1906 general election. He gained the seat from the sitting Conservative, James Archibald Morrison by 4,272 votes to 3,458 a majority of 724  Morse did not seek re-election in 1910 because of ill-health. In 1908 he was one of the members of the British group of the Inter-parliamentary Union who attended its conference in Berlin.

Religion
Morse was a devout member of the Primitive Methodist Church and was a delegate to its centenary conference in Toronto, Ontario, Canada.
He also became Vice-president of the Primitive Methodist conference in 1896.

Death

He died at his home, The Croft, Swindon on 10 September 1913 aged 60 years. Swindon solicitor A. Ernest Withy published notice of his estate in the London Gazette, 31 October 1913. 

He is buried in Radnor Street Cemetery, Swindon.

References

External links 

1853 births
1913 deaths
Liberal Party (UK) MPs for English constituencies
Members of Wiltshire County Council
UK MPs 1906–1910
Mayors of places in Wiltshire
People from Swindon
English Methodists